Elk Creek is a stream in Bourbon and Linn counties, in the U.S. state of Kansas.

Elk Creek was named for the elk seen there by early settlers.

See also
List of rivers of Kansas

References

Rivers of Bourbon County, Kansas
Rivers of Linn County, Kansas
Rivers of Kansas